The four provinces, capital territory and two autonomous territories of Pakistan are subdivided into 39 administrative "divisions", which are further subdivided into districts, tehsils and finally union councils. These divisions were abolished in 2000, but restored in 2008.

The divisions do not include the Islamabad Capital Territory or the Federally Administered Tribal Areas, which were counted at the same level as provinces, but in 2018, the Federally Administered Tribal Areas were subsumed into Khyber Pakhtunkhwa Province and allocated to neighbouring divisions therein.

History
Administrative divisions had formed an integral tier of government from colonial times. The Governor's provinces of British India were subdivided into divisions, which were themselves subdivided into districts. At independence in 1947, the new nation of Pakistan comprised two wings – eastern and western, separated by India. Three of the provinces of Pakistan were subdivided into ten administrative divisions. The single province in the eastern wing, East Bengal, had four divisions – Chittagong, Dacca, Khulna and Rajshahi. The province of West Punjab had four divisions – Lahore, Multan, Rawalpindi and Sargodha. The North-West Frontier Province (as it was then called) had two divisions – Dera Ismail Khan and Peshawar. Most of the former Sind Province became Hyderabad Division. Most of the divisions were named after the divisional capitals, with some exceptions.

From 1955 to 1970, the One Unit policy meant that there were only two provinces – East and West Pakistan. East Pakistan had the same divisions as East Bengal had previously, but West Pakistan gradually gained seven new divisions to add to the original six. The Baluchistan States Union became Kalat Division, while the former Baluchistan Chief Commissioner's Province became Quetta Division.   Princely State of Khairpur and with some parts of Hyderabad division were joining  to form Khairpur Division. The former princely state of Bahawalpur became Bahawalpur Division, therefore joining West Punjab. The Federal Capital Territory was absorbed into West Pakistan in 1959 and in 1960 merged with the district of Las Bela to form the Karachi-Bela Division. In 1969, the princely states of Chitral, Dir and Swat were incorporated into West Pakistan as the division of Malakand with Saidu as the divisional headquarters. In 1975, Khairpur division abolished and replace it with Sukkur Division. In 1980, Sukkur division(Formally Khairpur division) was bifurcated to create Larkana division. In 1990, Mirpurkhas division created by bifurcation of Hyderabad division.

In 2000, Government abolished division system in the In the Sindh Province.

On 11 July 2011, Sindh government restored division in the province.

On 24 April 2014, Create Banbhore Division by bifurcation of Hyderabad division and Shaheed Benazirabad Division by bifurcation of Sukkur, Hyderabad and Mirpur Khas division.

On 17 August 2022, Gujrat Division was established in Punjab Province. Recently, 1 new division was created in Punjab Province named Mianwali Division on 14 January 2023.

New Divisions 
When West Pakistan was dissolved, the divisions were regrouped into four new provinces. Gradually over the late 1970s, new divisions were formed; Hazara and Kohat divisions were split from Peshawar Division; Gujranwala Division was formed from parts of Lahore and Rawalpindi divisions; Dera Ghazi Khan Division was split from Multan Division; Faisalabad Division was split from Sargodha Division; Sibi Division was formed from parts of Kalat and Quetta divisions; Lasbela District was transferred from Karachi Division to Kalat Division; Makran Division split from Kalat Division. The name of Khairpur Division was changed to Sukkur Division and Headquarters of Khairpur Division shifted from khairpur to Sukkur. Shaheed Benazirabad is also a new division in Sindh.

During the military rule of General Zia-ul-Haq, the Advisory Council of Islamize Ideology (headed by Justice Tanzilur Rahman) was tasked with finding ways to Islamic the country. One of its recommendations was that the existing four provinces should be dissolved and the twenty administrative divisions should become new provinces in a federal structure with greater devolution of power, but this proposal was never implemented.

In the recent past (i.e. in last three decades), Naseerabad Division was split from Sibi Division; Zhob Division was split from Quetta Division; Bannu Division was split from Dera Ismail Khan Division; Mardan Division was split from Peshawar Division; Larkana Division were split from Sukkur Division and Shaheed Benazirabad DivisionMirpur Khas Division and Banbhore Division were split from Hyderabad Division. Sahiwal Division was formed from parts of Lahore and Multan Divisions while Sheikhupura Division was formed from Lahore and Faisalabad Divisions. The capital of Kalat Division was moved from Kalat to Khuzdar. Rakhshan Division is recently added to Balochistan comprising parts of Quetta and Kalat Divisions with capital at Kharan.

Recently in June 2021, Loralai Division was added to Balochistan, by splitting off from Zhob Division. Recently on 17 August 2022 Gujrat Division was added to Punjab. On January 14, 2023, Mianwali Division was added to Punjab.

Abolition 
In August 2000, local government reforms abolished the "Division" as an administrative tier and introduced a system of local government councils, with the first elections held in 2001. Following that there was radical restructuring of the local government system to implement "the principle of subsidiarity, whereby all functions that can be effectively performed at the local level are transferred to that level". This meant devolution of many functions, to districts and tehsils, which were previously handled at the provincial and divisional levels. At abolition, there were twenty-six divisions in Pakistan proper – five in Sindh, six in Balochistan, seven in Khyber-Pakhtunkhwa and eight in Punjab. Abolition did not affect the three divisions of Azad Kashmir, which form the second tier of government.

Restoration

In 2008, after the public elections, the new government decided to restore the divisions of all provinces.

In Sindh after the lapse of the Local Governments Bodies term in 2010 the Divisional Commissioners system was to be restored.

In July 2011, following excessive violence in the city of Karachi and after the political split between the ruling PPP and the majority party in Sindh, the MQM and after the resignation of the MQM Governor of Sindh, PPP and the Govt. of Sindh decided to restore the commissioner system  in the province. As a consequence, the five divisions of Sindh have been restored namely, Karachi, Hyderabad, Sukkur, Mirpurkhas and Larkana with their respective districts. As mentioned earlier, two new divisions added in Sindh i.e. Bhanbore and Shaheed Benazirabad divisions.

Karachi district has been de-merged into its 5 original constituent districts namely Karachi East, Karachi West, Karachi Central, Karachi South and Malir. Recently Korangi has been upgraded to the status of a sixth district of Karachi. These six districts form the Karachi Division now.

Current divisions 
The following tables show the current 37 divisions by province with their respective populations as of the 2017 Census of Pakistan.

Provinces

Administered territories

Divisions by population

See also 
 Administrative units of Pakistan
 Division (country subdivision)
 Divisions of Punjab
 Former administrative units of Pakistan
 Local government in Pakistan

References

External links 
 
 Decentralisation Programme
 National Reconstruction Bureau
 Devolution Trust of Pakistan

 
Subdivisions of Pakistan
Pakistan